Yashaltinsky District (Yaşaltan rayon) is an administrative and municipal district (raion), one of the thirteen in the Republic of Kalmykia, Russia. It is located in the west of the republic. Its administrative center is the rural locality (a selo) of Yashalta. As of the 2010 Census, the total population of the district was 17,178, with the population of Yashalta accounting for 27.5% of that number.

History
The district was established in 1938.

Administrative and municipal status
Within the framework of administrative divisions, Yashaltinsky District is one of the thirteen in the Republic of Kalmykia. The district is divided into eleven rural administrations which comprise twenty-four rural localities. As a municipal division, the district is incorporated as Yashaltinsky Municipal District. Its eleven rural administrations are incorporated as eleven rural settlements within the municipal district. The selo of Yashalta serves as the administrative center of both the administrative and municipal district.

References

Notes

Sources

Districts of Kalmykia
 
States and territories established in 1938